Barrie Dunn is a Canadian actor, lawyer, film and television producer best known for his character Ray LaFleur on the Canadian mockumentary television program Trailer Park Boys.

Education
Dunn received a Diploma in Theatre from the London Drama Studio in London, England in 1976. He received his Bachelor of Public Relations from Mount St. Vincent University in 1985, receiving the President's Award for his academic achievements. Dunn graduated from Dalhousie University with a Bachelor of Laws (LL.B) in 1998.

Career
Dunn worked for many years at the Canadian Broadcasting Corporation, winning the Moonsnail award for "Best Documentary" for his work on Theatre on the Mulgrave Road at the Atlantic Film Festival. Barrie has made guest lectures on entertainment law issues at Dalhousie University, and taught Film and Television Production at Mount Saint Vincent University as well, both in Nova Scotia. Before getting involved in the film industry Barrie was a street performer in Eastern Europe.

Dunn began earning screen credits for acting in 1990.  He portrayed main character Ricky's father Ray Lafleur (Flower) in the Trailer Park Boys TV and film franchise between 2001 and 2014.  He also had writing and production credits on multiple projects in the franchise.  Dunn was also among the producers of the 2011 film Afghan Luke.

Dunn was a practicing lawyer at the law firm Pink Larkin. He was called to the Nova Scotia Bar in 1999. Dunn is a previous President of the Nova Scotia Film & Television Producers Association.

References

External links

Male actors from Nova Scotia
Canadian male film actors
Film producers from Nova Scotia
Canadian male television actors
Canadian television producers
Lawyers in Nova Scotia
Living people
1952 births